Richa is a surname. Notable people with this surname include:
Ana Richa (born 1966), Brazilian beach volleyball player
Andréa W. Richa, Brazilian-American computer scientist
Antonio Dominguez Richa (1932–2020), Panamanian politician
Beto Richa (born 1965), Brazilian engineer and politician
 (1934–2003), Brazilian politician, namesake of José Richa Hydroelectric Plant
Susana Richa de Torrijos (born 1924), Panamanian educator, essayist, and politician
Ziad Richa (born 1967), Lebanese skeet shooter